Ferne Jacobs, who is also known as Ferne K. Jacobs and Ferne Kent Jacobs is an American fiber artist and basket maker.

Life 
She was born in Chicago, Illinois in 1942 to Jewish parents who emigrated from Eastern Europe.  Her family moved to Los Angeles when Ferne was young.  She took art and craft classes at the Art Center College of Design (Pasadena, California, 1960-1963), the Pratt Institute (New York City, 1964-1965), San Diego State University (San Diego, California, 1965), California State University, Long Beach (Long Beach, California, 1966-1967), Haystack Mountain School of Crafts (Deer Isle, Maine, 1967-1971). She earned an MFA from Claremont Graduate University (Claremont, California) in 1976.  She credits Dominic di Mare, Lenore Tawney and Arline M. Fisch as her inspirations.  Jacobs lives in Los Angeles, California.

Jacobs is best known for her contemporary baskets that combine contemporary colors and non-traditional forms with ancient basket weaving techniques of knotting and twisting. The Honolulu Museum of Art Spalding House (formerly The Contemporary Museum, Honolulu), the Mint Museum of Art (Charlotte, North Carolina) and the Smithsonian American Art Museum are among the public collections holding works by Ferne Jacobs.

References

Further reading
 Peters, Jan, Kevin Wallace and Ray Leier, Baskets: Tradition and Beyond, Cincinnati, Ohio, North Light Books, 2000.
 Trapp, Kenneth R. and Ferne Jacobs, Intertwined: Contemporary Baskets from the Sara and David Lieberman Collection, Tempe, Arizona, Arizona State University Art Museum, 2006.

External links
 Interview with Ferne Jacobs
Ferne Jacobs at Nancy Margolis Gallery

American textile artists
Jewish American artists
Living people
1942 births
People from Los Angeles
Claremont Graduate University alumni
San Diego State University alumni
Pratt Institute alumni
Art Center College of Design alumni
20th-century American women artists
Women textile artists
21st-century American Jews
21st-century American women